Michael Jay Schewel (born May 8, 1953) is an American attorney. A partner at McGuireWoods, he previously served as Virginia Secretary of Commerce under Governor Mark Warner. He is a son of state senator Elliot Schewel.

References

Living people
1953 births
Princeton University alumni
State cabinet secretaries of Virginia
University of Virginia School of Law alumni